Dec 99th is an alternative hip hop group consisting of Mos Def and Ferrari Sheppard. The duo also collaborates on visual art and fashion projects.

History 
In 2013, Mos Def and Sheppard met in Addis Ababa, Ethiopia and began collaborating on visual art and web projects. Sheppard, a photographer and journalist at the time, quietly began making music to relax. The two soon began releasing music as Dec. 99th.

On August 1, 2016, Dec 99th released their fourth song on Tidal titled "Hymn", following the previously released "N.A.W", which was followed up by "Tall Sleeves" and later "Local Time". The track was accompanied by a statement from the pair, "Condolences to the families of the slain. Never stop pursuing freedom," likely a reference to police killings in the United States.

The group released their fifth track, "Seaside Panic Room" two days after releasing "Hymn", causing many music writers to anticipate a full-length Dec 99th album.

Discography
December 99th (2016)

References

American hip hop groups
Hip hop duos
American musical duos